Events from the year 1956 in Belgium

Incumbents
Monarch: Baudouin
Prime Minister: Achille Van Acker

Events
 7 June – Labour Treaty signed at The Hague establishing free movement of labour between Belgium, Luxembourg and the Netherlands, to come into force 1 November 1960.
 8 August – Mining accident of Marcinelle claims 262 lives, including 136 Italian foreign workers

Publications
 L. Petilllon, Belgium's Policy in the Belgian Congo (New York, Belgian Government Information Center)

Births
 19 June – Mireille Versele, cystic fibrosis campaigner (died 1982)
 23 September – Serge Noël, poet (died 2020)

Deaths

References

 
Belgium
Years of the 20th century in Belgium
1950s in Belgium
Belgium